The 1936 Tour of Flanders was held in 1936.

General classification

Final general classification

References
Résultats sur siteducyclisme.net
Résultats sur cyclebase.nl

External links
 

Tour of Flanders
1936 in road cycling
1936 in Belgian sport